Jane Thomas was the wife of a colonel in South Carolina who fought for the rebels in the American Revolution. She passed key intelligence that thwarted an ambush of Whig forces.

Early life
She was a native of Chester County, Pennsylvania, and the sister of Reverend John Black, of Carlisle, the first president of Dickinson College. She was married about 1740, to John Thomas, thought to be a native of Wales, who had been brought up in the same county. From 10-15 years after their marriage, they moved to South Carolina, living for some time on Fishing Creek in Chester District. In around 1762, they moved to what is now Spartanburg, South Carolina and settled in Fairforest Creek. Jane Thomas was a respected figure in the community, one of the first members of the Fairforest Church Presbyterian congregation organized around that time, which she attended as long as she lived in the district.

John Thomas as Colonel
For many years before the Revolutionary war, John Thomas was a magistrate and a captain of militia, resigning both of these positions before the war started. When Colonel Fletcher refused to accept a commission under the authority of the province of South Carolina, an election was held, and John Thomas became Colonel of the Spartan regiment, operating close to the frontier and involving significant amounts of active service. Colonel Thomas led his regiment into a battle with Native Americans in 1776. When that campaign ended, and the Native Americans sued for peace, Thomas was entrusted with the protection of a long section of the frontier. He retained his command until after the fall of Charleston.

As soon as the news of the surrender of Charleston reached the borders of the State, Thomas and other colonels drew up plans to concentrate their forces in order to protect the country. They were impeded in this by Colonel Fletcher, who still remained in the neighborhood, and informed some British troops who had recently arrived in the area, as well as a loyalist cavalry regiment 30 miles away. These forces were united, and surprised Colonel Brandon's forces at the meeting point before the others arrived. Within a short time, almost every Whig between the Broad and Saluda rivers was forced to abandon the country or accept British protection, with many of them fleeing to North Carolina. Colonel Thomas, too old to flee, was forced to accept protection, hoping to be allowed to live with their families. However, he was soon arrested, and imprisoned at Ninety Six, South Carolina. He was later transferred to Charleston, where he remained until near the close of the war.

Ambush at Cedar Spring
While visiting her husband and two sons in Ninety Six, Jane Thomas overheard a conversation between some Tory women, hearing one of them say: "To-morrow night the loyalists intend to surprise the rebels, at Cedar Spring." The Whigs were posted at the Cedar Spring at the time, within a few miles of her house, and some of her children were among them. Thomas resolved to notify the Whig rebels of the news, and left quickly, riding 60 miles the next day to relay the information to her sons and friends the following night. 

The rebels were therefore able to prepare measures for self-defense, withdrawing to the surrounding woods a short distance from their camp-fires, which were prepared to burn as brightly as possible. At that point they heard from a distance the loyalist forces approaching their camp by stealth. When they reached the camp, apparently without being detected, the loyalist forces attacked, expecting to carry out an ambush. However, thanks to Jane Thomas's information, the Whig forces were able to open fire from their secure positions, and thus inflicted heavy casualties on the attacking army. In this way, 60 Whigs were able to repel and roundly defeat an attacking force of around 150 loyalists.

Retirement
Soon after the end of the war, John and Jane Thomas moved to Greenville district, where they lived the rest of their lives.

Children
Thomas had nine children, and her sons and sons-in-law were active soldiers. 

 Her eldest son John rose during the war from the rank of captain to succeed his father in the command of the Spartan regiment, commanding at the battle of the Cowpens, among others.
 Robert, another son, was killed in Roebuck's defeat. 
 Abram, who was wounded and captured at Ninety Six, died in enemy imprisonment. 
 William was also a soldier. 
 Martha, one of the daughters, married Josiah Culbertson, who received a captain's commission towards the close of the war.
 Ann, married Joseph McJunkin, who entered the military as a private aged 20, and rose to the rank of major by 1780.
 Jane, the third daughter, married Captain Joseph McCool.
 Letitia was the wife of Major James Lusk.

References

 
 

People of South Carolina in the American Revolution
Women in the American Revolution
Year of birth missing
Year of death missing